was a town located in Minamikawachi District, Osaka Prefecture, Japan.

As of 2003, the town had an estimated population of 38,956 and a density of 2,951.21 persons per km². The total area was 13.20 km².

On February 1, 2005, Mihara was merged into the expanded city of Sakai and now forms Mihara-ku within Sakai.

Dissolved municipalities of Osaka Prefecture
Populated places disestablished in 2005
2005 disestablishments in Japan
Sakai, Osaka